Liran Rotman (born 7 June 1996) is an Israeli professional footballer who plays as a midfielder for Israeli Premier League club Maccabi Netanya.

Early life
Rotman was born in Ness Ziona, Israel, to a family of Ashkenazi Jewish descent.

Club career
Rotman join up to Hapoel Rishon LeZion, when he was child. At the age of 14, Rotman moved to Sektzia Ness Ziona. On 2 May 2014, he made his senior debut in the 2–0 victory against F.C. Kafr Qasim.

In January 2015, Rotman signed in the Israeli Premier League club Maccabi Petah Tikva. On 1 June 2020 he made his senior debut while entering as a substitute in the 87th minute in the 2–0 victory against Maccabi Tel Aviv in a game in which he also managed to score. Rotman scored a goal in the 3–0 victory against Ironi Kiryat Shmona in the 2015–16 Toto Cup Al final, on February 2, 2016. In that season, Rotman played 9 games in all competitions in which he started in 4 of them.

In summer 2017, Rotman was loaned to the Liga Leumit club Hapoel Ramat Gan until the end of the season. On August 3, 2017, Rotman made his debut in Ramat Gan in a Toto Cup Leumit match against Hapoel Tel Aviv, which ended in a 0-0 result.

In summer 2018, Rotman returned to Maccabi Petah Tikva.

On February 27, 2019, Rotman signed in Beitar Jerusalem and it was agreed that he would move there at the end of the season. On 28 July 2019, Rotman made his debut in Beitar in the 2–1 victory against his youth team, Sektzia Ness Ziona. On December 22, 2019 he scored his debut goal in Beitar in the 5–0 victory against Hapoel Rishon LeZion.

Statistics

Club

Honours

Club
Maccabi Petah Tikva
Toto Cup Al: 2015–16

Beitar Jerusalem
Toto Cup Al: 2019–20

Maccabi Netanya
Toto Cup Al: 2022–23

See also
List of Jewish footballers
List of Jews in sports
List of Israelis

References

External links

1996 births
Living people
Israeli Ashkenazi Jews
Israeli Jews
Jewish footballers
Israeli footballers
Sektzia Ness Ziona F.C. players
Maccabi Petah Tikva F.C. players
Hapoel Ramat Gan F.C. players
Beitar Jerusalem F.C. players
Hapoel Hadera F.C. players
Maccabi Netanya F.C. players
Liga Leumit players
Israeli Premier League players
Footballers from Ness Ziona
Association football midfielders